Brown rice is a whole grain rice with the inedible outer hull removed. This kind of rice sheds its outer hull or husk but the bran and germ layer remain on, constituting the brown or tan colour of rice. White rice is the same grain without the hull, the bran layer, and the cereal germ. Red rice, gold rice, and black rice (also called purple rice) are all whole rices with differently pigmented outer layers.

Cooking time
Brown rice generally needs longer cooking times than white rice, unless it is broken or flour blasted (which perforates the bran without removing it). Studies by Gujral and Kumar in 2003 estimated a cooking time between 35 and 51 minutes.
A shorter cooking time is necessary for "converted" or parboiled rice.

Storage 

Brown rice has a shelf life of approximately 6 months, but hermetic storage, refrigeration or freezing can significantly extend its lifetime. Freezing, even periodically, can also help control infestations of Indian meal moths.

Arsenic 

Rice plants accumulate arsenic, and there have been concerns over excessive arsenic levels in rice. There is more arsenic in the bran, so brown rice contains more arsenic. The European Union has introduced regulations on arsenic in rice, but the United States has not.

Natural arsenic levels in groundwater and soils vary. Rice grown in some regions contains less arsenic than others. Arsenic from pesticides and poultry fertilizer may be taken up by rice.

A 2012 report from the US publication Consumer Reports found measurable levels of arsenic in nearly all of the 60 varieties of rice and rice products it tested in the US. Consumer Reports states that brown rice has 80 percent more inorganic arsenic on average than white rice of the same type, because the arsenic tends to accumulate in the outer layers of the grain. Its 2013 analysis found that rice cereal and pasta can possess significantly more inorganic arsenic than the 2012 data showed; Consumer Reports said just one serving of rice cereal or pasta could place children over the maximum amount of rice it recommended for their weekly allotment, due to arsenic content. One study published in the Proceedings of the National Academy of Sciences journal found a median level of arsenic that was 56% higher in the urine of women who had eaten rice.

Composition

Nutritional content 
Brown rice and white rice have similar amounts of calories and carbohydrates. Between 72 and 82% of the dry weight of brown rice is starch, of which the majority is in the form of digestible starch. Brown rice therefore has the lowest protein and fiber content of cereal grains but the highest starch and carbohydrate content whilst its energy content is the second highest, after oats. Due to the low dietary fiber content there was a delay before the US FDA considered brown rice as a whole grain.

Brown rice is a whole grain and a good source of magnesium, phosphorus, selenium, thiamine, niacin, vitamin B6, and manganese and does provide some fiber. White rice, unlike brown rice, has the bran and germ removed, and therefore has different nutritional content.

Brown rice is whole rice from which only the husk (the outermost layer) is removed. To produce white rice, the next layers underneath the husk (the bran layer and the germ) are removed leaving mostly the starchy endosperm.

Several vitamins and dietary minerals are lost in this removal and the subsequent polishing process. Among these are oil in the bran, which is removed along with the bran layer, dietary fiber, small amounts of fatty acids, and magnesium. A part of these missing nutrients, such as vitamins B1 and B3, and iron, are sometimes added back into the white rice. In the US the result is called "enriched rice" and must comply with Food and Drug Administration (FDA) regulations for this name to be used. 

It has been found that germinated grains in general have nutritional advantages. Germinated brown rice (GBR), developed during the International Year of Rice, is brown rice that has been soaked for 4–20 hours in warm  water before cooking. This stimulates germination, which activates various enzymes in the rice, giving rise to a more complete amino acid profile, including GABA. Cooked brown rice tends to be chewy; cooked GBR is softer, and preferred particularly by children.

See also 
 Brown rice tea
 Brown rice green tea
 Matta rice
 Genmaicha

References

External links

American Chinese cuisine
Rice dishes
Rice
Rice varieties
Peasant food

de:Reis#Verarbeitung